Leletu Skelem (born 12 May 1998) is a South African professional soccer player who plays for South African Premier Division side Maritzburg United, as a midfielder.

Early life
Skelem grew up in Mthatha, Eastern Cape. Despite showing a preference for cricket and swimming in his early childhood but chose to pursue a career in football after his father bought him a replica of the 1996 Bafana Bafana kit.

Career
Having been spotted playing for South Africa at under-20 level, Skelem signed for Stellenbosch in 2018. He scored twice in 26 league games for Stellenbosch in the 2018–19 season, as the club were promoted as to the South African Premier Division as champions of the National First Division.

In August 2021, Skelem signed for Maritzburg United.

Honours
Stellenbosch
National First Division: 2018–19

References

External links
 
 

1998 births
Living people
South African soccer players
Association football midfielders
Stellenbosch F.C. players
Maritzburg United F.C. players
South African Premier Division players
National First Division players
South Africa youth international soccer players
People from Mthatha
Soccer players from the Eastern Cape